The Men's doubles competition began on 10 October 2010. There were a total of XX competitors.

First quarter

Second quarter

Third quarter

Fourth quarter

Semifinals

See also
2010 Commonwealth Games
Table tennis at the 2010 Commonwealth Games

References

Table tennis at the 2010 Commonwealth Games